Nuaija is a district in Qatar, located in the municipality of Ad Dawhah. One of Nuaija's zones, Zone 41, was formerly known as Al Hilal West but was incorporated into Nuaija as of the 2010 census. Municipal authorities are developing district as a major mixed-use hub for south-central Doha.

Etymology
Deriving its name from the Arabic word naaja meaning "female sheep", (this incorrect) the area was so named because a well in the area was said to yield water as sweet as sheep's milk.

History
In J.G. Lorimer's Gazetteer of the Persian Gulf, Nuaija was described as place 3 miles from the town of Al Bidda from whence the town derived its water supply in 1908. He remarked that Nuaija would have to be garrisoned if an external force who invaded Al Bidda were to retain possession of the town. He also states that date palms are grown in the area. As it was rich in bird fauna, it was a popular area for falconry among locals until its rapid development in the later 20th century.

Transport

Major roads that run through the district are Najma Street, Haloul Street, Rawdat Al Khail Street, C Ring Road, D Ring Road, E Ring Road and Salwa Road.

Currently, the underground Nuaija Metro Station is under construction, having been launched during Phase 1A. Once completed, it will be part of Doha Metro's Green Line.

Qatar National Master Plan
The Qatar National Master Plan (QNMP) is described as a "spatial representation of the Qatar National Vision 2030". As part of the QNMP's Urban Centre plan, which aims to implement development strategies in 28 central hubs that will serve their surrounding communities, Nuaija has been designated a District Centre, which is the lowest designation. 

The District Centre encompasses the intersection of Najma Street and D ring Road. One of the longer-term objectives set out by the plan is the construction of a green highway to the Industrial Area sometime in the 2030s. Environmental sustainability is a key goal of the plan.

Demographics

As of the 2010 census, the district comprised 4,525 housing units and 401 establishments. There were 29,703 people living in the district, of which 53% were male and 47% were female. Out of the 29,703 inhabitants, 72% were 20 years of age or older and 28% were under the age of 20.

Employed persons made up 55% of the total population. Females accounted for 37% of the working population, while males accounted for 63% of the working population.

Education
The following schools are located in Nuaija:

References

Communities in Doha